WGRX is a Country formatted broadcast radio station licensed to Falmouth, Virginia, serving Fredericksburg and Spotsylvania Courthouse in Virginia.  WGRX is owned and operated by Telemedia Broadcasting, Inc.

References

External links
 Thunder 104.5 Online
 

2001 establishments in Virginia
Country radio stations in the United States
Radio stations established in 2001
GRX